Grevillea quinquenervis, also known as the five-nerved grevillea, is a species of flowering plant in the family Proteaceae and is endemic to the western end of Kangaroo Island in South Australia. It is an erect, dense shrub with more or less linear to oblong or narrowly egg-shaped leaves and clusters of pale to deep pink flowers.

Description
The upper surface of the leaves usually has 5 prominent, longitudinal veins.

Taxonomy
Grevillea quinquenervis was first formally described in 1909 by John McConnell Black in Transactions, proceedings and report, Royal Society of South Australia from specimens collected in 1908. The specific epithet (quinquenervis) refers to the five-veined leaves.

Distribution and habitat
Five-nerved grevillea grows in heath, shrubland and forest on the western half of Kangaroo Island in South Australia.

See also
 List of Grevillea species

References

quinquenervis
Proteales of Australia
Flora of Kangaroo Island
Taxa named by John McConnell Black
Plants described in 1909